The Hunter School of the Performing Arts (abbreviated as HSPA) is a government-funded co-educational selective and specialist primary and secondary day school which offers a comprehensive curriculum with a performing arts specialty, located in , in the Hunter Region of New South Wales, Australia.

Established in 1923, the school enrolled 1,150 students in 2018, from Year 3 to Year 12, of whom four percent identified as Indigenous Australians and eight percent were from a language background other than English. The school is operated by the NSW Department of Education; the principal is now Mr Darren Ponman as of Term 1 2023. The school is unique in terms of public selective schools to cater to both primary and secondary school students. Enrolment is by audition online and/or on-site.

History 

The school has undergone many name changes since its establishment in July 1923.

As a technical school
 1923–1926: Newcastle Junior Technical and Domestic Science School
 1927–1931: Broadmeadow Junior Technical School
 1932–1960: Newcastle Central Technical School

As a general high school
 1961–1965: Broadmeadow Boys High School
 1966–1975: Broadmeadow Boys School
 1976–1992: Broadmeadow High School (co-educational)

As a performing arts school
 1993–1997: The Broadmeadow School of Performing Arts
 1998–present: Hunter School of the Performing Arts

A notable moment in this school's recent history was the June 2007 Hunter Region and Central Coast storms. The Hunter School of the Performing Arts was one of the most severely affected schools in the area. The school suffered a large amount of damage; the entire bottom level was washed away and the school's library was severely affected. The March 2021 eastern Australia floods in New South Wales also affected HSPA by the closure of the school's Hunter Theatre. Due to the downstairs floor featuring an orchestra pit, storage room and boys and girls dressing rooms being flooded and waterlogged which caused a costly amount of collateral electrical damage. The theatre is now partially functional, open to the school and external clients.

Motto and colours
The original motto was "Advance", which changed after the school became a boys' school in 1932 to Faber est suae quisque fortunae. The motto was changed in 1999 to its English form, "Each of us is responsible for our own destiny". "Performing at Our Best" is the motto most commonly used today, taken from the school's vision statement.

The original colours of the school were those of the 35th Battalion ("Newcastle's Own Regiment") of World War I, green and brown. In later years it changed to green and white. In 1999, students were given a survey in a bid for them to choose their own school colours; they chose jade, purple and black. To keep a link with the Newcastle colours, the new logo (of the mask, dancer and bass clef) has been incorporated into a shield which also has a ribbon of brown and a ribbon of green.

Following the change in the school colours, a new school uniform was introduced in 2000, with options ranging from formal to casual, including performance and sporting wear. In 2001, the school's marching band uniform changed to reflect this as well, formerly being green and gold, and now has a uniform consisting of black, purple and jade.

Music 

The school is home to a number of musical ensembles. Two concert bands, three choirs and a "senior vocal ensemble", string orchestra, two stage bands, a marching show band and percussion ensemble are well known within the school and community and frequently perform at festivals, parades, ceremonies and competitions.

Additionally, the school holds a musical every year between the three performing arts and the HSPA Theatre Crew led by Theatre Manager Jim Bowman and the TAS staff. Alternating leads between the primary and secondary sections of the school, these musicals are performed in the theatre built on school grounds in 2007: the Hunter Theatre.

Dance 
There are many dance opportunities within the school. Groups participate in a wide range of activities, including Star Struck, Schools Spectacular, Hunter Schools Dance Festival and State Dance Festival. There is also a range of dance ensembles, such as hip hop and ballet, and these are audition only.

The dance production class gives students an opportunity to do project based learning (PBL) along with designing projects that the students want.

Notable alumni

 Genevieve Clay-Smithfilm director and writer
 Isabelle Cornishactress and model
 Charli Robinsonsinger, actress and radio presenter, Hi-5
 Michelle Lim Davidsonactress
 Mathew HelmOlympic diver
 Ivy Latimeractress
 Rhys Nicholsoncomedian and 2009 Grand Finalist in Raw Comedy competition
 Short Stackpop punk/indie band (Shaun Diviney, lead vocalist and guitarist; Andy Clemmensen, bassist and back-up vocalist; Bradie Webb, drummer)
 Geraldine Viswanathanactress
 Tanya Hennessydigital content creator, comedian, writer and television presenter

See also 

 List of creative and performing arts high schools in New South Wales
 Education in Australia

References

External links 
 
 The Hunter Theatre

Creative and performing arts high schools in New South Wales
Educational institutions established in 1923
1923 establishments in Australia
Public high schools in New South Wales
Public primary schools in New South Wales
Education in Newcastle, New South Wales